Rumelia, etymologically "Land of the Romans", at the time meaning Eastern Orthodox Christians and more specifically Christians from the Byzantine rite, was the name of a historical region in Southeastern Europe that was administered by the Ottoman Empire, corresponding to the Balkans. In its wider sense, it was used to refer to all Ottoman possessions and vassals in Europe that would later be geopolitically classified as "the Balkans". During the period of its existence, it was more often known in English as Turkey in Europe.

Etymology

Rûm in this context means "Roman", and ėli means "land" and Rumelia (Rūm-ėli; Turkish: Rumeli) means "Land of the Romans" in Ottoman Turkish. It refers to the lands conquered by the Ottoman Empire in the Balkans, which formerly belonged to the Byzantine Empire, known by its contemporaries as the Roman Empire. Although the term Byzantine Empire is used by modern historians, the empire's citizens and emperors called themselves Romans, meaning Christians, more specifically Greek Christians, and embraced a Christian identity. Various languages in the Balkans have long used the descriptor "Roman" to refer to the lands of the former Byzantine Empire. The old Latin documents in Genoa use the term Romania, the common name for the Byzantine Empire during the Middle Ages.

Originally, the Seljuks used the name "Land of the Rûm" (Romans) to define Anatolia, which the armies of the Seljuk Empire gradually conquered from the Byzantine Empire after the Battle of Manzikert in 1071. The Anatolian Seljuk Sultanate was called the Sultanate of Rum by its contemporaries, meaning the "Sultanate of the Roman Empire" or "Roman Sultanate", which mostly covered central Anatolia until the Battle of Köse Dağ in 1243. Anatolia was referred to as Land of the Christians, hence Rum. Afterwards, it was replaced by the Anatolian beyliks, among which the Ottoman Beylik rose to prominence in the 14th and 15th centuries and eventually became the Ottoman Empire.

However, following the expansion of the Ottoman Empire into Anatolia and the Balkans in the second half of the 14th century and after the conquest of Constantinople (now Istanbul) in 1453 by Mehmed II, the term Rumeli came to apply exclusively to the Balkan region of the Ottoman Empire. The region remained primarily populated by Christians; though gradually, the Albanians, Bosniaks and Pomaks, among others, converted to Islam.

Many grand viziers, viziers, pashas and beylerbeyis were originally from Rumelia.

Geography

Rumelia included the provinces of Thrace, Macedonia and Moesia, which are now Bulgaria and Turkish Thrace, bounded to the north by the rivers Sava and Danube, west by the Adriatic coast and south by the Morea. In the beginning the main town was the city of Plovdiv, then Sofia. The name "Rumelia" was ultimately applied to a province composed of central Albania and northwestern Macedonia, with Bitola being the main town.

Following the administrative reorganization made by the Ottoman government between 1870 and 1875, the name Rumelia ceased to correspond to any political division. Eastern Rumelia was constituted as an autonomous province of the Ottoman Empire by the Treaty of Berlin (1878), but on September 6, 1885, after a bloodless revolution, it was united with Bulgaria. The Kosovo Vilayet was created in 1877.

In Turkey, the word Trakya (Thrace) has now mostly replaced Rumeli (Rumelia) to refer to the part of Turkey that is in Europe (the provinces of Edirne, Kırklareli, Tekirdağ, the northern part of Çanakkale Province and the western part of Istanbul Province). However, "Rumelia" remains in use in historical contexts and is still used in the context of the culture of the current Turkish populations of the Balkans and the descendants of Turkish immigrants from the Balkans. The region in Turkey is also referred to as Eastern Thrace, or Turkish Thrace. In Greece, the term  has been used since Ottoman times to refer to Central Greece, especially when it is juxtaposed with the Peloponnese or Morea. The word Rumeli is also used in some cases, mostly in Istanbul, to refer exclusively to the part of Istanbul Province that is west of the Bosphorus strait.

See also
 Turks in the Balkans
 Sultanate of Rum
 Millet (Ottoman Empire)
 Rum Millet
 Ottoman wars in Europe
 Ada Kaleh
 Ottoman Greece
 Ottoman Bulgaria
 Ottoman Vardar Macedonia
 Ottoman Serbia
 Ottoman Bosnia and Herzegovina
 Ottoman Albania
 Ottoman Kosovo

References

Sources

External links

15th-century establishments in the Ottoman Empire
Byzantine Empire
Divided regions
Historical regions
History of the Balkans by region
Ottoman Greece
 01
Ottoman period in the history of Bulgaria
Subdivisions of the Ottoman Empire
Turkish toponyms